Momar Bangoura (born 24 February 1994 in Dakar) is a Senegalese footballer and Guinean origin. He currently plays for Cluses Scionzier Football Club in France.

Club career
Bangoura last played for French club Marseille in Ligue 1. He plays as a midfielder and made his professional debut on 28 April 2012 in a league match against Lorient, where he appeared as a substitute.

References

External links 
 
 
 

1994 births
Living people
Footballers from Dakar
French footballers
Senegalese footballers
French sportspeople of Senegalese descent
French sportspeople of Guinean descent
Olympique de Marseille players
Ligue 1 players
Association football midfielders
Swindon Town F.C. players
FC Zirka Kropyvnytskyi players
French expatriate footballers
Expatriate footballers in Ukraine
French expatriate sportspeople in England
Expatriate footballers in England
French expatriate sportspeople in Ukraine
Black French sportspeople